Charles Luis Reiter (born 26 April 1988), simply known as Charles, is a Brazilian footballer who plays as a central defender.

Career

Club
On 30 November 2016, Charles signed for Nagoya Grampus in the J2 League, with his contract being terminated by mutual consent on 26 June 2017.

Career statistics

Club

References

External links

1988 births
Living people
People from Blumenau
Brazilian footballers
Association football defenders
Campeonato Brasileiro Série A players
Campeonato Brasileiro Série B players
Campeonato Brasileiro Série C players
Campo Grande Atlético Clube players
Joinville Esporte Clube players
Fortaleza Esporte Clube players
Paysandu Sport Club players
Ceará Sporting Club players
Paraná Clube players
J2 League players
Nagoya Grampus players
Brazilian expatriate footballers
Brazilian expatriate sportspeople in Japan
Expatriate footballers in Japan
Sportspeople from Santa Catarina (state)